Mikhail Potapov may refer to:

 Mikhail Feofanovich Potapov (1921–1943), Soviet Red Army artillery captain
 Mikhail Potapov (mathematician), Russian mathematician